Down in Mississippi may refer to:

Down in Mississippi, album by blues guitarist J. B. Lenoir and title song with Fred Below on drums
Down in Mississippi, song performed by Jimmy Reed 
Down in Mississippi, song recorded by Pops Staples
Down in Mississippi, a song recorded by Mavis Staples on her 2007 album We'll Never Turn Back, written by J. B. Lenoir
Down in Mississippi (Up to No Good), a song by Sugarland
Down in Mississippi a 2008 play by Carlyle Brown